Vilho is a given name, and may refer to:

 Vilho Luolajan-Mikkola (1911–2005), Finnish composer
 Vilho Niittymaa (1896–1979), Finnish athlete
 Vilho Petter Nenonen (1883–1960), Finnish general
 Vilho Rättö (1913–2002), Finnish Knight of the Mannerheim Cross
 Vilho Siivola (1910–1984), Finnish actor, director and a member of the Council of Theatre
 Vilho Tuulos (1895–1967), Finnish triple jumper and long jumper
 Vilho Väisälä (1889–1969), Finnish meteorologist and physicist

Finnish masculine given names